Sansi Township is a township in Nanhe District, Xingtai, Hebei, China. , it administers the following 13 villages:
Dongbeibu Village
Xisong Village
Huaizhuang Village
Xida Village
Dongda Village
Lishou Village
Xinanbu Village
Dongnanbu Village
Xibeibu Village
Qianguoping Village
Houguoping Village
Xin Village
Nanhan Village

References 

Township-level divisions of Hebei
Xingtai